Peter Anderson (3 February 1950 – 27 December 2012) was a New Zealand cricketer. He played seven first-class matches for Northern Districts between 1977 and 1979.

Anderson had one outstanding match, when he opened the bowling against Canterbury at Tauranga Domain in the Shell Cup in January 1979 and took 5 for 74 and 5 for 38 in Northern Districts' 56-run victory. He also played Hawke Cup cricket for Bay of Plenty from 1976 to 1982.

See also
 List of Northern Districts representative cricketers

References

External links
 

1950 births
2012 deaths
New Zealand cricketers
Northern Districts cricketers
People from Taihape